Nova Šarovka  is a village in Croatia.

References

Populated places in Virovitica-Podravina County